The Central Fire Station is a historic fire station at 26 Quincy Avenue in Quincy, Massachusetts.  The -story brick Colonial Revival structure was built in 1938 to a design by local architect George Robinson (who also designed a number of Quincy's other period firehouses).  The building is evocative of (if less ornate than) Philadelphia's Independence Hall, with paired side chimneys on its main block and on its three wings, and its cupola.

The building was listed on the National Register of Historic Places in 1989.

See also
National Register of Historic Places listings in Quincy, Massachusetts

References

Fire stations on the National Register of Historic Places in Massachusetts
Colonial Revival architecture in Massachusetts
Fire stations completed in 1938
Buildings and structures in Quincy, Massachusetts
National Register of Historic Places in Quincy, Massachusetts